Lazo Džepina (born October 27, 1966) is a Croatian Serb businessman, football manager, and former player.

His playing career initially began with Dinara, and later in the First League of FR Yugoslavia with Rad. He received his first piece of silverware in the First League of the Republika Srpska with FK Borac Banja Luka by winning the Republika Srpska Cup. His playing career came to a conclusion abroad in 2005 in the Canadian Professional Soccer League with Hamilton Thunder.  

After retiring from professional football he made the transition to the managerial side by managing in the Croatian Third Football League with his former club Dinara in 2010. After a season in Croatia he returned to the CSL to manage the Brantford Galaxy, where in his first season he led the team to a CSL Championship. After a series of poor performances in 2011 he was relieved from his coaching duties. In 2011, SC Waterloo Region was granted a CSL franchise with Džepina holding several shares in the club, and was given the coaching responsibilities. He led Waterloo to their first and his second championship medal in 2013.

Playing career
Džepina began his career with his hometown club Dinara. In 1990, he signed with Rad of the First League of FR Yugoslavia, and played with FK Borac Banja Luka where he won the Republika Srpska Cup. In 2005, he went abroad to Canada to play with the Hamilton Thunder of the Canadian Professional Soccer League.

Managerial career
After his retirement from competitive football he managed NK Dinara in 2010. In 2010, he returned to Canada to manage expansion franchise Brantford Galaxy in the Canadian Soccer League. In preparation for the 2010 season, Džepina utilized the growing procession of European players to the CSL by recruiting their services. The acquisition of European imports played a pivotal role in Brantford's championship success in defeating Hamilton Croatia by a score of 3-0. The victory marked a historic milestone in CSL history as Brantford became the first expansion side to win the title in their debut season. The following season he continued in his capacity as head coach, and further strengthened his roster with additional imports from Europe. Unfortunately after a mediocre start to the season Džepina was dismissed from his post.

In 2012, after the promotion of Kitchener Waterloo United FC to the CSL First Division the team was renamed to SC Waterloo Region with Džepina becoming a shareholder in the organization. He assumed the managerial duties of the club, and continued in his policy of European recruitment. In his first season with Waterloo he failed to secure the final postseason berth by two points. Džepina brought further championship success to the Waterloo region in the 2013 season with the senior team defeating Kingston FC, while the reserve squad claimed the Second Division championship after defeating Toronto Croatia B. The victories placed Džepina in a class of distinction by becoming the second head coach in CSL history in acquiring more than one CSL Championship. His next significant season was in the 2015 season, where Waterloo reached the championship finals, but were defeated in the finals to Toronto Croatia. While the reserve team clinched the Second Division title, but lost in the finals to Milton SC B.

Honours

Manager
Brantford Galaxy
CSL Championship: 2010
SC Waterloo Region
CSL Championship: 2013

References

1966 births
Living people
Sportspeople from Knin
Serbs of Croatia
Association football midfielders
Serbian footballers
Croatian footballers
FK Rad players
FK Borac Banja Luka players
Hamilton Thunder players
First League of Serbia and Montenegro players
Canadian Soccer League (1998–present) players
Croatian expatriate footballers
Expatriate soccer players in Canada
Croatian expatriate sportspeople in Canada
Croatian football managers
Canadian Soccer League (1998–present) managers
Croatian expatriate football managers
Expatriate soccer managers in Canada